The stalk borer (Papaipema nebris) is a moth of the family Noctuidae. It is found from southern Canada, through the Eastern United States (East of the Rocky Mountains) to the Gulf of Mexico, although it is absent from Florida.

This wingspan is 25–44 mm. The moth flies from June to September depending on the location.

The larvae are considered a pest of corn but also feed on various other large-stemmed plants, such as Ambrosia trifida.

References

External links
 Butterfliesandmoths.org
 Species info
 North Carolina State University species sheet on stalk borer

Papaipema
Moths of North America